Daljirka Dahsoon is a Tomb of the Unknown Soldier memorial located in Mogadishu. The monument was erected in honour of the Somali men and women who died in defense of the Somali Republic. It is an important landmark in Mogadishu. It is located near to the hotel Naaso Hablood. In July 2017, Somali commemoration of those who have given their life for the freedom of Somalis.

References

Monuments and memorials in Somalia